The Joint Force Training Centre (JFTC) is a NATO headquarters located in Bydgoszcz, Poland, responsible to Allied Command Transformation at Norfolk, Virginia, in the United States.

History
The Joint Force Training Centre, which started on March 31, 2004, focuses on joint and combined training at the tactical level. In particular, it focuses on the conduct of joint tactical training to achieve joint tactical interoperability at the key tactical interfaces. It reached full operational capability on June 30, 2006.

It cooperates with other national training centres, including Partnership for Peace training centres and the Centre of Excellence. As a priority, the JFTC provides support to the NATO Response Force (NRF) joint and component commanders in the training and exercising of the NRF, focusing on joint and combined competences.

In October 2008, JFTC relocated from its home on ul. gen. Józefa Dwernickiego (gen. Józefa Dwernickiego Street) to a new simulations centre on ul. Szubińska (Szubińska Street).

References

External links
Official Website

Train
Buildings and structures in Bydgoszcz
Education in Bydgoszcz
Military installations of Poland
Military education and training